Michael Lee (born February 3, 1983) is an American retired professional basketball player and current scout for the Golden State Warriors of the National Basketball Association. He played college basketball for the Kansas Jayhawks.

High school career
Lee played for the Jefferson Democrats in Northeast Portland. The Democrats won the 2000 4A Oregon state championship, beating Tualatin 58-44, and capping a 28-0 season. The Democrats finished the year with a No. 4 national ranking and several other players went on to play in college, such as Aaron Miles (Kansas), Thomas Gardner (Missouri), and Brandon Brooks (USC).

College career
Michael Lee attended the University of Kansas, where he starred at the guard position for the Kansas Jayhawks men's basketball team. He helped lead the Jayhawks to two consecutive Final Four appearances in 2002 and 2003 and an appearance in the 2003 national championship game.

Coaching career
After a short professional playing career, Lee went into coaching with stints as an assistant coach with both Gardner–Webb and San Francisco.

On September 9, 2017, Lee was named assistant coach of the Santa Cruz Warriors, the NBA G League developmental affiliate of the Golden State Warriors. In 2021, he was moved the staff of the Golden State Warriors as a professional scout.

References

1983 births
Living people
African-American basketball players
American men's basketball players
Basketball coaches from Oregon
Basketball players from Portland, Oregon
Gardner–Webb Runnin' Bulldogs men's basketball coaches
Jefferson High School (Portland, Oregon) alumni
Kansas Jayhawks men's basketball players
San Francisco Dons men's basketball coaches
Santa Cruz Warriors coaches
Sportspeople from Portland, Oregon
Guards (basketball)
21st-century African-American sportspeople
20th-century African-American people